Guzaarish is a Pakistani television series that aired on ARY Digital in 2015. It is produced by Humayun Saeed and Shahzad Nasib under Six Sigma Plus and written by Sanam Mehdi Jarchevi. Yumna Zaidi, Ahmed Ali and Affan Waheed play the roles of Zara, Zain and Saad respectively.

Plot
Series explores the story of Zain and Zara who are in love and are about to married. What follows, is disappointingly a typical evil mother-in-law who was all out to make sure her son turns against the daughter-in-Law (Zara) and has her thrown out of the house.

Cast
 Yumna Zaidi as Zara
 Affan Waheed as Saad
 Ahmed Ali Akbar as Zain
 Javed Sheikh as Aalam
 Saba Hamid as Batool (Phupo)
 Alyy Khan as Jaffar
Saba Faisal as Zain's mother
 Maha Warsi as Hina
 Sara Ashraf as Sara
 Arjumand Hussain as Siddiqui
 Seemi Pasha as Hina's mother
 Jahanzeb Khan as Khurram
 Farah Nadeem as Sara's mother in law

References

External links 
 Official Website

2015 Pakistani television series debuts
ARY Digital original programming
Pakistani drama television series
Television shows set in Karachi
Urdu-language television shows